Fakhreddine Rajhi (born 3 October 1960) is a Moroccan footballer. He played in two matches for the Morocco national football team in 1991 and 1992. He was also named in Morocco's squad for the 1992 African Cup of Nations tournament.

References

External links
 

1960 births
Living people
Moroccan footballers
Footballers from Rabat
Morocco international footballers
1992 African Cup of Nations players
Association football forwards